Eyemouth transmitting station is a high-power relay transmitter of Selkirk, covering parts of eastern Berwickshire. It is owned and operated by Arqiva. Eyemouth transmitting station uses a 46 metre tall radio tower.

Services listed by frequency

Analogue radio

Digital radio

Analogue television
These services were closed down on 20 November 2008. BBC2 Scotland was previously closed on 6 November.

Digital television
BBC A began broadcasting on 6 November 2008, Digital 3&4 on 20 November 2008, and BBC B on 30 November 2010.

External links
 http://tx.mb21.co.uk/gallery/eyemouth.php

Transmitter sites in Scotland